Some Came Running is a 1958 American drama film directed by Vincente Minnelli and starring Frank Sinatra, Dean Martin, and Shirley MacLaine, based on the 1957 novel of the same name by James Jones. Set in 1948, it tells the story of a troubled Army veteran and author who returns to his Midwestern home town after 16 years, to the chagrin of his wealthy, social-climbing brother.

Metro-Goldwyn-Mayer, in a bid to duplicate the success of the multi–Academy Award winning film adaptation of Jones' earlier novel, From Here to Eternity (1953), optioned the 1,200-plus-page book Some Came Running and cast Sinatra as the lead. Sinatra approved Dean Martin for the role of Bama, in what would be their first film together. MacLaine garnered her first Oscar nomination, which she credited to Sinatra for his insistence on changing the film's ending. The film was released in CinemaScope and Metrocolor.

Plot
In 1948, Dave Hirsh is a cynical Army veteran who winds up in his hometown of Parkman, Indiana, after being put on a bus in Chicago while intoxicated. Ginny Moorehead, a woman of seemingly loose morals and poor education, was invited by Dave in his drunken state to accompany him to Parkman. When Dave sobers up, he realizes it was a mistake, and gives her money to return to Chicago. However, she decides to stay because she has fallen in love with Dave and is also trying to avoid a violent boyfriend in Chicago.

Dave left 16 years before and had a career as a writer before the war, publishing two books. He did not stay in touch with his older brother, Frank, because of how Frank and his wife Agnes treated him when he was a child. Frank, who was newly married to the well-off Agnes, had placed Dave in a charity boarding school rather than take him to live in his home. Frank has since inherited a jewelry business from Agnes' father, sits on the board of a local bank, and is active in civic affairs. Frank and Agnes are very concerned about their social status and reputation in the town, which is threatened when Dave returns without letting them know and then deposits $5,500 ($60,704 in 2021) in the bank that competes with Frank's bank. Frank attempts to make amends with Dave in order to get him to move the bank deposit. Agnes wants nothing to do with Dave, but is forced to welcome him after two of her wealthy social acquaintances, Professor French and his daughter Gwen, a schoolteacher who teaches creative writing, ask to meet Dave because they admire his books.

When Dave meets Gwen, he immediately falls in love with her. She is attracted to him as well, but is afraid of the passionate feelings he arouses in her and of his lifestyle. Each time Gwen rejects him, he ends up back with Ginny, even though her lack of intelligence frustrates him and she is nothing like Gwen. Dave has also befriended a hard-partying but good-hearted gambler, Bama Dillert, and the two get into trouble when Ginny's ex-boyfriend, a gangster named Ray, comes to town stalking her.

Dave proposes to Gwen, and she tries to reject him, but her passion is stirred as she falls into his arms.

Frank is upset because Dave's lifestyle reflects badly on him. However, Dave is shown to be a good man despite his notorious reputation when he treats Ginny with kindness and takes a fatherly interest in his niece, Frank's daughter Dawn, who becomes upset and tries to run away when she sees her father in a romantic rendezvous with his secretary, Edith.

With Gwen's encouragement and help in editing, Dave gets a new story published in The Atlantic magazine. Gwen confesses her love to Dave by telephone while he is on a gambling trip with Bama and Ginny. Gwen's phone call leads the gamblers to think Dave is cheating at cards, triggering a fight in which Bama is stabbed. During his hospital stay, Bama is informed he has diabetes, but chooses to disregard medical advice, especially about his incessant drinking.

Ginny visits Gwen at her school to ask if Gwen and Dave are in a relationship and confess her own love for Dave. Gwen is horrified to discover Dave has been seeing Ginny, assures Ginny that there is nothing between her and Dave, and then cuts Dave off. Dave, at the end of his rope from Gwen's rejection, decides to marry Ginny, even over Bama's objections. While she is not Dave's social or intellectual match, Dave recognizes that she gives him unconditional love that he's never had from anyone else. The two marry that night, but soon after they leave the judge's house, while walking among the crowds of the town's fair, Ray comes after them with a gun, shoots and injures Dave who falls to the ground, and then fatally shoots Ginny as she leaps upon Dave's fallen body to protect him from Ray's bullets.  Dave places Ginny's lifeless head on the pillow she treasured as his first gift to her.

At Ginny's funeral, Professor French and a tearful Gwen, distraught at her role in the tragedy, attend the solemn occasion. Ashamed of his callous treatment of Ginny, a sorrowful Bama removes his hat, which he has never previously done in a token of respect for her tragic heroism.

Cast

 Frank Sinatra as Dave Hirsh
 Dean Martin as Bama Dillert
 Shirley MacLaine as Ginny Moorehead
 Martha Hyer as Gwen French
 Arthur Kennedy as Frank Hirsh
 Nancy Gates as Edith Barclay
 Leora Dana as Agnes Hirsh
 Betty Lou Keim as Dawn Hirsh
 Larry Gates as Professor Robert Haven French
 Steven Peck as Raymond Lanchak (Ray)
 Connie Gilchrist as Jane Barclay
 Ned Wever as Smitty

Production
Much of the film was shot in and around the town of Madison, Indiana. Shirley MacLaine reported that Sinatra was "besieged" by the local Indiana women, and that at one point a woman broke through a rope barrier around a house and flung herself at Sinatra as her husband ran to stop her, pleading "Helen, you don't even know the man!".

One significant change from the James Jones novel was the death of Ginny; in the novel, it is Dave who is killed, shot in the face by Ray.

Reception

Released to critical plaudits, Some Came Running was praised both nationally and internationally on release, 
The Variety review stated, "Jones' novel has been stripped to essentials in the screenplay, and those are presented in hard clean dialog and incisive situations."

Sinatra garnered some of the strongest notices of his career; Variety noted that "Sinatra gives a top performance, sardonic and compassionate, full of touches both instinctive and technical. It is not easy, either, to play a man dying of a chronic illness and do it with grace and humor, and this Martin does without faltering."

The film was popular with the public. According to MGM records, it earned $4,245,000 in the US and Canada and $2,050,000 elsewhere, becoming the 10th highest-earning film of 1958. But its high cost meant that MGM would record a loss of $207,000 ($ million today) on the film.

Awards and nominations

Legacy
Martin Scorsese included a clip from the film for his A Personal Journey with Martin Scorsese Through American Movies; the film's final carnival scene remains for Scorsese one of the best and most expressive uses of CinemaScope.

In his book Who the Hell's in It, director Peter Bogdanovich writes extensively about Some Came Running. He later filmed a short segment for Turner Classic Movies on its influence on cinema.

In the 1997 movie Flubber, the robot Weebo uses a clip from the film as a shout-out for why she won't sabotage the professor’s relationship anymore.

DVD
Some Came Running was released to DVD by Warner Home Video on May 13, 2008 as a Region 1 widescreen DVD and also on the same date as part of the 5-disc box set Frank Sinatra: The Golden Years with Some Came Running as the fourth disc.

See also
 List of American films of 1958

References

External links
 
 
 
 
 
 Variety's review

1958 films
1958 drama films
American drama films
Films about writers
Films based on American novels
Films directed by Vincente Minnelli
Films produced by Sol C. Siegel
Films scored by Elmer Bernstein
Films set in 1948
Films set in Indiana
Films shot in Indiana
Films shot in Kentucky
Metro-Goldwyn-Mayer films
CinemaScope films
Films about veterans
1950s English-language films
1950s American films